Lunar tourism may be possible in the future if trips to the Moon are made available to a private audience. Some space tourism startup companies are planning to offer tourism on or around the Moon, and estimate this to be possible sometime between 2023 and 2043.

Types

Tourist flights would be of three types: flyby in a circumlunar trajectory, lunar orbit, and lunar landing.

Cost
Some of the space tourism start-up companies have declared their cost for each tourist for a tour to the Moon.
 Circumlunar flyby: Space Adventures is charging $150 million per seat, a price that includes months of ground-based training, although this is only a fly-by mission, and will not land on the Moon. Excalibur Almaz had the same price tag but never managed to send their capsule to space.
 Lunar orbit:
 Lunar landing: The Golden Spike Company charged $750 million per seat for future lunar landing tourism.

Possible attractions

Two natural attractions would be available by circumlunar flight or lunar orbit, without landing:
 View of the far side of the Moon
 View of the Earth rising and setting against the lunar horizon

Protection of lunar landmarks

The site of the first human landing on an extraterrestrial body, Tranquility Base, has been determined to have cultural and historic significance by the U.S. states of California and New Mexico, which have listed it on their heritage registers, since their laws require only that listed sites have some association with the state. Despite the location of Mission Control in Houston, Texas has not granted similar status to the site, as its historic preservation laws limit such designations to properties located within the state. The U.S. National Park Service has declined to grant it National Historic Landmark status, because the Outer Space Treaty prohibits any nation from claiming sovereignty over any extraterrestrial body. It has not been proposed as a World Heritage Site since the United Nations Educational, Scientific and Cultural Organization (UNESCO), which oversees that program, limits nations to submitting sites within their own borders.  An organization called For All Moonkind, Inc. is working to develop enforceable international protocols that will manage the protection and preservation of these and other human heritage sites in outer space.

Interest in affording historical lunar landing sites some formal protection grew in the early 21st century with the announcement of the Google Lunar X Prize for private corporations to successfully build spacecraft and reach the Moon; a $1 million bonus was offered for any competitor that visited a historic site on the Moon. One team, led by Astrobotic Technology, announced it would attempt to land a craft at Tranquility Base. Although it canceled those plans, the ensuing controversy led NASA to request that any other missions to the Moon, private or governmental, human or robotic, keep a distance of at least  from the site. A company called PTScientists plans to return to the Taurus-Littrow Valley, the site of the Apollo 17 mission landing.  PTScientists is a partner of For All Moonkind, Inc. and has pledged that its mission will honor heritage preservation and abide by all relevant guidelines.

Proposed missions

Space tourism companies which have announced they are pursuing lunar tourism include Space Adventures, Excalibur Almaz, Virgin Galactic and SpaceX.

 The company Space Adventures has announced a planned mission, titled DSE-Alpha, to take two tourists within  of the lunar surface, using a Soyuz spacecraft piloted by a professional cosmonaut. The trip would last around a week.

 In February 2017, Elon Musk announced that substantial deposits from two individuals had been received by SpaceX for a Moon loop flight using a free return trajectory and that this could happen as soon as late 2018. Musk said that the cost of the mission would be "comparable" to that of sending an astronaut to the International Space Station, about US$70 million in 2017. In February 2018, Elon Musk announced the Falcon Heavy rocket would not be used for crewed missions. The proposal changed in 2018 to use the BFR system instead. In September 2018, Elon Musk revealed the passenger for the trip, Yusaku Maezawa during a livestream. Yusaku Maezawa described the plan for his trip in further detail, dubbed the #dearMoon project, intending to take 6–8 artists with him on the journey to inspire the artists to create new art.

Cancelled proposals
 Excalibur Almaz proposed to take three tourists in a flyby around the Moon, using modified Almaz space station modules, in a low-energy trajectory flyby around the Moon. The trip would last around 6 months. However, their equipment was never launched and is to be converted into an educational exhibit.

 The Golden Spike Company was an American space transport startup active from 2010–2013. The company held the objective to offer private commercial space transportation services to the surface of the Moon. The company's website was quietly taken offline in September 2015.

See also

 Commercialization of space
 Colonization of the Moon
 Free return trajectory
 Lunar resources
 NewSpace
 Space tourism

References

External links
 
 The Future of Lunar Tourism : Patrick Collins
 The Moon & Space Tourism : The Moon Society

Moon
Space tourism